This is a list of Italian television related events from 1953..

Events 

 11 October First issue of La domenica sportiva (The sporty Sunday), the longest-lasting show of the Italian television, even today aired. Three reports are broadcast, about : 
 the football (soccer) match Inter-Fiorentina for the Serie A 1953-1954, won by Inter 2-1;
 a 50 kilometres race walk in Abbiategrasso won by Giuseppe Dordoni (the athlete is also the first guest in studio of the show);
 Tre Valli Varesine cycling race, won by Nino Defilippis

22 October The 24 years old Nicoletta Orsomando debuts in RAI introducing a documentary for children; she will be, for forty years, the most notorious and beloved RAI’s “Miss good evening” (female continuity announcer).

Television shows 

 Album personale di Wanda Osiris (Wanda Osiris’ personal album) – tribute to the most popular Italian showgirl of the time, directed by Daniele D’Anza.

References 

1953 in Italian television